The women's 200 metres competition of the athletics events at the 2019 Pan American Games will take place between the 8 and 9 of August at the 2019 Pan American Games Athletics Stadium. The defending Pan American Games champion is Kaylin Whitney from United States.

Summary
Sporting bright green hair, the diminutive 2013 world champion Shelly-Ann Fraser-Pryce stood out from the crowd.  When the gun fired, she stood out again, taking the lead she would not relinquish.  Vitória Cristina Rosa ran a personal best to get silver almost 2 steps behind.

Records
Prior to this competition, the existing world and Pan American Games records were as follows:

Schedule

Results
All times shown are in seconds.

Semifinal
Qualification: First 2 in each heat (Q) and next 2 fastest (q) qualified for the final.
Wind:Heat 1: -1.0 m/s, Heat 2: 0.0 m/s, Heat 3: +0.4 m/s

Final
The results were as follows

Wind: -0.1 m/s

References

Athletics at the 2019 Pan American Games
2019